Angela King (born May 26, 1975) is an American peace activist, speaker, and researcher who co-founded the peace advocacy group Life After Hate. King spent eight years in the neo-Nazi skinhead movement before she was arrested, convicted and sentenced to prison for her part in an armed robbery of a Jewish-owned store. She is also a co-founder of ExitUSA, which provides support to individuals who are looking to leave racism and violence behind.

Early life 
King was born and raised in South Florida, the eldest of three children. She was raised in a strict conservative family, attended a private Baptist school and Catholic Church services each week. When King was still young her parents divorced; she and her sister lived with their mother, while her brother moved in with her father.

Career 
King was arrested in 1998 for armed robbery and served three years in federal prison. There she fell in love with another inmate and the two began a romantic relationship. King has since come out a gay woman. When she was released from prison in 2001, King was dedicated to de-radicalizing and leaving the violent far-right. At the suggestion of her probation officer, she began speaking publicly about her experiences, and attained a master's degree in interdisciplinary studies at the University of Central Florida.

In 2011, she helped co-found Life After Hate and is currently the organization's Director of Innovation & Special Projects. She also co-founded ExitUSA.

In 2018, she was the inspiration for, and was among the cast in, an award-winning virtual reality film, Meeting a Monster, which was produced by Oculus VR and was featured at the Tribeca Film Festival.

References

1975 births
Living people
Lesbians
University of Central Florida alumni
Activists from Florida
21st-century American women
Former white supremacists